Vanth, full designation , is the single known natural satellite of the plutino and likely dwarf planet 90482 Orcus. With a diameter of about 440 km, it is half the size of Orcus and probably the third-largest known moon of a known trans-Neptunian object, after Pluto I Charon and Eris I Dysnomia, though it is possible that the poorly resolved Varda I Ilmarë or Haumea I Hiiaka might be comparable in size. Vanth was discovered by Michael Brown and T.-A. Suer using discovery images taken by the Hubble Space Telescope on 13 November 2005. The discovery was announced in an IAU Circular notice published on 22 February 2007.

Using observations with the Hubble Space Telescope from 13 November 2005, Michael Brown and T. A. Suer detected a natural satellite. The discovery of a satellite of Orcus was reported in an IAU Circular notice published on 22 February 2007. The satellite was given the designation S/2005 (90482) 1 before later being named Vanth. It orbits Orcus in a nearly face-on circular orbit with an eccentricity of about 0.007, and an orbital period of 9.54 days. Vanth orbits only  from Orcus and is too close to Orcus for ground-based spectroscopy to determine the surface composition of the satellite.

Brown suspects that like the Pluto–Charon system, which are similar in their relative sizes, Orcus and Vanth are tidally locked. Vanth does not resemble known collisional satellites because its spectrum is very different from that of its primary, and it may be a captured Kuiper belt object. Vanth could also have originated as a result of rotational fission of the primordial Orcus, which would have rotated much faster than now.

Name 
Upon discovery, Vanth was issued a provisional designation, . On 23 March 2009, Brown asked readers of his weekly column to suggest possible names for the satellite, with the best one to be submitted to the International Astronomical Union (IAU) on 5 April. The name Vanth, the winged Etruscan psychopomp who guides the souls of the dead to the underworld, was chosen from among a large pool of submissions. Vanth was the only suggestion that was purely Etruscan in origin. It was the most popular submission, first suggested by Sonya Taaffe. This submission was assessed and approved by the IAU's Committee for Small Body Nomenclature, in accordance with the naming procedures for minor planets and satellites. The official naming citation was announced in a Minor Planet Circular notice published on 30 March 2010.

Brown quoted Taaffe as saying that if Vanth "accompanies dead souls from the moment of death to the underworld itself, then of course her face is turned always toward Orcus", a reference to the likely synchronous orbit of Vanth about Orcus.

Characteristics 

However, the dissimilar colors of Orcus (neutral) and Vanth (red) suggest that Vanth could have an albedo a factor of two lower than Orcus. The mass of Vanth also depends on its albedo and can vary from 3 to 9 percent of the total system mass. They also measured Vanth's albedo as only , almost 3 times darker than Orcus.

For 7 March 2017, a stellar occultation by Orcus had been predicted to take place in the Americas and over the Pacific Ocean. Observations were made at five sites in North and South America, and two solid body chords were observed, with the more precise one being . Using speckle imaging, the occulted star was revealed to be a close double star, and a reconstruction of the orbits of Orcus and Vanth showed that both chords were from Vanth (occulting either of the two stars) rather than Orcus. The occultation data is consistent with a pressure of at most 4 microbar for a global atmosphere of Vanth.

Vanth does not resemble other known collisional satellites because its spectrum is very different from that of its primary. Vanth may thus be a captured Kuiper belt object. In that respect, it may be similar to the satellite of another possible dwarf planet, Gonggong, which also has a very different colour compared to its primary.

Notes

References
 

90482 Orcus
Trans-Neptunian satellites
Astronomical objects discovered in 2005
Discoveries by Michael E. Brown
Objects observed by stellar occultation